Daksum (Kashmiri: ڈکسم) Is a natural scenic spot located in the Larnoo tehsil of Anantnag district, Jammu and Kashmir, at Anantnag-Semthan-Kishtwar road (NH-244).

Location
It is located at an altitude of 2,438m above the sea level.Coordinates: 33°36'43"N  75°26'6"E. It is 42 km from the district headquarters Anantnag and about 100 km from summer capital Srinagar, on the trekking route to Kishtwar. On the way to Daksum there is Botanical garden and spring called Kokernag one can enjoy. .One can reach Daksum by arriving vailoo, which is the base camp and from there one can board a cab.From there the trail leads to Sinthan Pass and Sinthan top.

References
 http://www.jktourismonline.com/kashmir-daksum.aspx
 https://web.archive.org/web/20120325155614/http://www.greaterkashmir.com/news/2011/Jul/16/govt-yet-to-bring-daksum-sinthan-top-on-tourist-map-54.asp
 http://www.oktatabyebye.com/destination-features/1901-about-daksum-pahalgam.html
 http://millitravels.com/Daksum.aspx

Anantnag district
Tourist attractions in Jammu and Kashmir
Geography of Jammu and Kashmir